Aujourd'hui (Today) was a daily newspaper which styled itself as "independent" and which was created in August 1940 by Henri Jeanson, to replace le Canard enchaîné under agreement with the Germans.
 
The first issue appeared on 10 September 1940.  In November 1940, the German authorities pressured the director into taking a public position against the Jews and in favour of politics of collaboration with the Vichy regime. Jeanson resigned, and was succeeded by the journalist Georges Suarez.

Aujourd'hui was far from innocent in its pursuit of those responsible for the 1940 defeat of France, resorting to the myth of the "clean sweep of the broom" in its notorious Anglophobia.  It began to reflect the narrative of Marshal Philippe Pétain and of German propaganda.  The paper was in favour of the Riom trials which were set up to punish the members of the pre-war government who were allegedly responsible for France's defeat in 1940.

Georges Suarez was shot in 1944.

Main contributors 
Robert Desnos, Félicien Challaye, Achille Dauphin-Meunier, Jean Anouilh, Marcel Aymé, Léon-Paul Fargue et André Juin.

Related pages 
 Anglophobia
 Antisemitism
 Collaboration
 Vichy regime
 Je suis partout
 Georges Suarez
 Otto Abetz

Defunct newspapers published in France
Home front during World War II
Newspapers of the Vichy regime
Daily newspapers published in France